Eruvadi is a town panchayath in Tirunelveli district  in the state of Tamil Nadu, India.

Geography
The Nambiyar River flows through the town.

History 

Eruvadi has existed for 800 to 1,000 years. The original village was situated on the southern bank of the Nambi River adjoining the temple and the surrounding paddy fields. The small bushed wilderness on the northern side of the river was called "Puliyur"; this is the site of the  present 1st street to 9th street area. The adjoining village is called "Puliyur Kurichi".

The spread of Islam led to the city's expansion between 400 and 700 years ago. According to local tradition, Eruvadi was subject to Islamic conquest by a Sufi warrior-saint named Saiyid Ibrahim with his 3,000 warrior disciples, in the twelfth century. The city has spread to Puliyur on the north side of the river with the streets ending at the river bank. The ancient people of Eruvadi were good at cultivation, trade and finance; they joined with the army of King Pandian Kulasekaran and went to fight with Cheran King and won the battle near Panakudi when Cheran King tried to occupy the Pandian kingdom. Eruvadi is also called Pulianjuvanam. There is an inscription at Muhaam Jumma Masjid about the name Pulianjuvanam.

Documentary Film

Yarbath - A historical documentary film was released on 2016. It was directed by Mohammed Aadhil Ashfaq.The film shows the roots of nellai eruvadi. Research for the documentary film duration is almost 18 months. This documentary has 1000 years of history. It elaborates the culture of eruvadi. And also it presents the achievers from various sector.

Demography

Population
The Eruvadi Town Panchayat has population of 18,067 of which 9,015 are males while 9,052 are females as per report released by Census India 2011.

Population of Children with age of 0–6 is 1991 which is 11.02% of total population of Eruvadi (TP). In Eruvadi Town Panchayat, Female Sex Ratio is of 1004 against state average of 996. Moreover, Child Sex Ratio in Eruvadi is around 893 compared to Tamil Nadu state average of 943. Literacy rate of Eruvadi city is 92.10% higher than state average of 80.09%. In Eruvadi, Male literacy is around 95.20% while female literacy rate is 89.05%.

Religion 
Eruvadi has Muslim, Hindu and Christian population and each community has their place of worship.

 Total - 18068 
 Muslims - 58.41%
Hindus - 36.61%
Christians - 4.98%

Government and Politics
Eruvadi is a Town Panchayat in district of Tirunelveli, Tamil Nadu. Eruvadi Town is divided into 15 wards for which elections are held every 5 years.

Eruvadi Town Panchayat has total administration over 4,239 houses to which it supplies basic amenities like water and sewerage. It is also authorized to build roads within Town Panchayat limits and impose taxes on properties coming under its jurisdiction.

Transport
It is roughly 38 km from Tirunelveli Town.  The nearest railway station is at Valliyur which is at a distance of 8 km from Eruvadi. Eruvadi is connected by road to Chennai (670 km), capital of Tamil Nadu (670 km), Madurai (205 km), and other major towns in South India. The nearest international airport is Thiruvananthapuram (113 km)

Education

Eruvadi has a government higher secondary school for boys and girls. Most of the local students are studying in government schools.
Eruvadi also has three matriculation Schools: Rani Matriculation Higher Secondary School, Al-Huda Matriculation Higher Secondary School and Annai Matriculation School . Also people of Eruvadi prefer to the schools located in the nearby town Vallioor and nearby.

Other schools located in Eruvadi are:
 Government Higher Secondary School.
 Elementary School.
 Rettakkaal School
 Panchayat Union Middle School
 SV Hindu Primary School
 NEMS Starters CBSE School
There is an Engineering College: PET Engineering College in a 11.1 km distance from Eruvadi Bus stand. Keins educational college for teacher training, Nehru nursing college and TDMNS Arts college is located in the surrounding towns.

Adjacent communities 

 Kalakadu
 Kanniyakumari
 Manimuthar
 Nambimalai
 Papanasam
 Thirukkurungudi

References

Cities and towns in Tirunelveli district